Prang is a town of Charsadda District in the Khyber Pakhtunkhwa province of Pakistan. It is at 34°8'20N 71°44'11E with an altitude of 276 metres (908 feet) and is above the junction of the Swat and Kabul rivers, 16 miles north-east of
Peshawar. It is practically the southern portion of the town of Charsadda.

History
The population 1901 was 10,235, consisting chiefly
of Muhammadzai Pathans.

References

Populated places in Charsadda District, Pakistan